The Jubilee Medal "70 Years of the Armed Forces of the USSR" was a state military commemorative medal of the Soviet Union established on January 28, 1988 by decree of the Presidium of the Supreme Soviet of the USSR to denote the seventieth anniversary of the creation of the Soviet Armed Forces.

Medal Statute 
The Jubilee Medal "70 Years of the Armed Forces of the USSR" was awarded to officers, warrant officers, sergeants, petty officers, sailors and soldiers, enlisted in the service and on active duty on February 23, 1988 in the Soviet Army, Navy, in the troops of the Ministry of Internal Affairs, in the armed forces of organs of the State Security, in the Council of Ministers of the USSR; to former Red Guards, soldiers who took part in the fighting to protect the Soviet homeland in the Armed Forces of the USSR, to partisans of the Civil War and the Great Patriotic War of 1941–1945; persons discharged from active military service in the reserve or retired, who served in the Soviet Army, Navy, in the troops of the Ministry of Internal Affairs, in the armed forces and organs of the State Security Council of Ministers of the USSR for 20 years or more or that were awarded during their active duty, military orders of the USSR or the medals "For courage", Ushakov, "For Military Merit", "For Distinction in Protection of State Border of the USSR", Nakhimov, "For Distinction in Military Service".

The medal was awarded on behalf of the Presidium of the Supreme Soviet of the USSR by commanders of military units, agencies and institutions.  For retirees, by republican, territorial, regional, district, municipal and district military commissariats.  Each medal came with an attestation of award, this attestation came in the form of a small 8 cm by 11 cm cardboard booklet bearing the award's name, the recipient's particulars and an official stamp and signature on the inside.

The Jubilee Medal "70 Years of the Armed Forces of the USSR" was worn on the left side of the chest and when in the presence of other medals of the USSR, it was located immediately after the Jubilee Medal "60 Years of the Armed Forces of the USSR".  If worn in the presence or awards of the Russian Federation, the latter have precedence.

Medal Description 

The Jubilee Medal "70 Years of the Armed Forces of the USSR" is a 32mm in diameter circular brass medal with a raised rim on both sides.  On its obverse in the center, the relief left overlapping bust profiles of three Soviet servicemen, a pilot wearing a flight helmet at left, a sailor in the middle, a helmeted soldier at right; above then the relief image of a five pointed star containing the hammer and sickle; below them the relief inscription in two rows “1918” and “1988” superimposed on a wreath of oak and laurel going up around the circumference of the medal and separated at the top by the five pointed star.  On the reverse, the relief inscription on five rows "70 Years of the Soviet Armed Forces" above crossed laurel and oak branches.

The medal was secured to a standard Soviet pentagonal mount by a ring through the medal suspension loop. The mount was covered by a 24mm wide red silk moiré ribbon with 2mm green edge stripes and a central 2mm blue stripe bordered by yellow 2mm stripes.

Recipients (partial list) 

The individuals below were all recipients of the Jubilee Medal "70 Years of the Armed Forces of the USSR".
 Cosmonaut Colonel Yuri Ivanovich Malenchenko
 Marshal of the Russian Federation and Defence Minister Igor Dmitriyevich Sergeyev
 Colonel General Pavel Alekseyevich Kurochkin
 Fleet Admiral Vladimir Ivanovich Kuroyedov
 Army General and former Deputy Defence Minister Yury Nikolayevich Baluyevsky
 Senior Lieutenant Anna Alexandrovna Timofeyeva-Yegorova
 Hero of the Soviet Union Sergeant Meliton Varlamovich Kantaria
 Colonel General Boris Vsevolodovich Gromov
 Hero of the Russian Federation Major General of Naval Aviation Timur Avtandilovich Apakidze
 Marshal of the Soviet Union Sergei Leonidovich Sokolov
 Army General Anatoly Vasiliyevich Kvashnin
 Army General Viktor Germanovich Kazantsev
 Lieutenant General Vladimir Anatolyevich Shamanov
 Colonel General Gennady Nikolayevich Troshev
 Fleet Admiral Vladimir Grogo'evich Yegorov
 FSB General Rashid Gumarovich Nurgaliyev
 Hero of Belarus Lieutenant Colonel Uładzimir Mikałajevič Karvat
 FSB Director and Army General Nikolai Platonovich Patrushev
 Cosmonaut Colonel Aleksandr Aleksandrovich Skvortsov
 Kazakh Army General Mukhtar Qapashuly Altynbayev
 World War 2 combat pilot Major Natalya Fyodorovna Meklin
 General and politician Nikolay Nikolayevich Bordyuzha
 Hero of Azerbaijan Lieutenant Colonel Riad Fikrat ogly Ahmadov
 World War 2 combat pilot Polina Vladimirovna Gelman
 Major General Igor Dmitrievich Sergun

See also 
Red Army
Awards and decorations of the Soviet Union

References

External links 
 Legal Library of the USSR

Military awards and decorations of the Soviet Union
1988 establishments in the Soviet Union
Awards established in 1988